Ciorani is a commune in Prahova County, Muntenia, Romania.  As of 2011, its population was 6,720. It is composed of two villages, Cioranii de Jos and Cioranii de Sus; the former is the administrative centre.

The commune is located in the southeastern part of the county, on the left bank of the river Cricovul Sărat, close to where it flows into the Prahova River. The 45th parallel north passes  to the north.

Its neighbors are the communes Fulga to the north, Sălciile to the east, Adâncata to the south, Rădulești to the southwest, and Drăgănești to the west.

Ciorani is traversed north to south by the DN1D road, which joins Ploiești to Urziceni. On the western side of the commune is the Ciorani railway station, serving the CFR rail line Ploiești–Urziceni–Călărași.

The  archaeological site Movila Dărâmata, in Cioranii de Sus, contains remains of dwellings from the Boian and Gumelnița cultures, as well as from the Bronze Age and Roman Dacia. At the southern entrance to the commune there is a statue of Dromichaetes.

Notable people
 Nelu Ploieșteanu (Ion Dumitrache)

References

Ciorani
Localities in Muntenia